Francis Bertie Boyce (6 April 1844 – 27 May 1931), commonly referred to as Archdeacon Boyce, was an Australian clergyman and social reformer.

Early life
Boyce was the son of Francis Boyce, an accountant, and his wife Frances, née Dunsford. He was born at Tiverton, Devonshire, England and was brought by his parents to Australia in the Earl of Charlemont and, after being shipwrecked off Barwon Heads, Victoria, arrived at Sydney in August 1853. Boyce was educated at St James Grammar School and at a private school kept by James Keane, and, his father having died in January 1858, entered the service of the Union Bank of Australia in the following December, and was with the bank for eight years.

Clerical career
Boyce decided to enter the Church of England and went to Moore Theological College, Liverpool, at the beginning of 1867, was ordained deacon in December 1868 by Bishop Barker and priest on 19 December 1869. His first parish was George's Plains near Bathurst, New South Wales, followed by Molong in 1873 and Orange from 1875. Boyce was a hard-working and enthusiastic country clergyman, he travelled many miles on horseback to reach his people; he also raised money to build churches where no church had been before. The church built at Orange cost £7000, had accommodation for 600 people, and few seats were vacant when Boyce was holding the service. In April 1882 he went to Pyrmont, an industrial area, and in 1884 to St Paul's, Redfern. He remained there for 46 years, was elected a canon of St Andrew's cathedral in December 1899, and in 1910 was appointed archdeacon of West Sydney.

St Paul's, Redfern, when Boyce went to it was socially a mixed parish. In George- and Pitt-streets there were many wealthy people, while on the western side of the railway line there was a dense population and part of it was a slum area. Boyce had for some time shown much interest in the temperance question and was active in fights for local option and the earlier closing of hotels. When the New South Wales Alliance was founded in 1882 he was the first secretary and afterwards was its president for over 20 years. He published a volume titled The Drink Problem in Australia (1893), and later brought out other publications on religious and temperance questions. He was much distressed by the poverty of some parts of his parish and especially the position of men and women too old to work. He believed in old-age pensions, and on 9 September 1895 wrote to the Sydney Daily Telegraph advocating the appointment of a committee to inquire into and report on this question. Early in 1896 he called a meeting to form a pensions league. J. C. Neild had also been advocating the granting of pensions in parliament, and eventually a committee was appointed which recommended that pensions should be paid out of the public revenue. Boyce worked hard to keep the question before the public, but it was not until the end of the 19th century that pensions became law. The first pensions were paid on 1 July 1901.

Boyce was an ardent Imperialist, and when the question of having an Empire Day was raised in 1902 he supported the suggestion with enthusiasm. He was spokesman of a deputation which waited on Sir Edmund Barton, the prime minister, and he continued his efforts for it until it was founded on 24 May 1905. Boyce was first president of the British Empire League in Australia in 1901 and also in 1909-11.

Late life
At meetings of the synod of the diocese of Sydney, Boyce took an important part, and he continued active work in his parish until extreme old age. He resigned his arch-deaconry in 1930 and died at Blackheath, New South Wales on 27 May 1931. He was married twice; firstly to Caroline, daughter of William Stewart, who died in 1918, and secondly to Mrs Ethel Burton, who survived him, with two sons by the first marriage. The elder son, Francis Stewart Boyce (1872-1940), became a KC in 1924 and a judge of the Supreme Court of New South Wales in 1932.

Honours
Mount Boyce is named in honour of Venerable Archdeacon Boyce.

Memorials to Boyce were placed in the Sydney and Bathurst cathedrals and his portrait by Julian Ashton was presented to the National Art Gallery of New South Wales in 1917. His memoirs were published posthumously in 1934 as Four-Score Years and Seven.

References

1844 births
1931 deaths
People from Tiverton, Devon
19th-century Australian Anglican priests
20th-century Australian Anglican priests